Jadrolinija is a Croatian sea shipping company. It is a state-owned company and its main mission is connecting Croatian islands to the mainland by operating regular passenger and cargo transport services. The company mainly operates car ferries on domestic routes along the Croatian coast, as well as international routes across the Adriatic Sea to Italy (to ports at Ancona and Bari).

Jadrolinija currently operates a fleet of 53 vessels: it has three large ferries named Dubrovnik, Marko Polo, and Zadar which are used on long range and international routes, 36 smaller ferries used for local passenger service, ten catamarans and four conventional ships. The fleet's total carrying capacity is 4,444 vehicles and 30,010 passengers.

Jadrolinija was founded in Rijeka on 20 January 1947 as a continuation of various smaller shipping companies which had operated along the Croatian coast since 1872. In 2021, its ships carried 10,525,510 passengers and 3,153,416 vehicles.

Projects 
In January 2022, Minister Oleg Butković announced the procurement of six new ships, three passenger ships, two of which are hybrid-powered up to 45 meters in length and three catamarans. It is expected that two will be built in 2023. One of the ships should replaced MS Postira.

In November 2022, Jadrolinija announced a tender for the sale of MF Dubrovnik at a price of 2.85 million euros. The competition lasts until March 2023.

In January 2023, a tender was announced for the procurement of three new electrically powered passenger ships. The ships should sail in the Dubrovnik area, on the line to the Elafites, in the Šibenik area, where they will maintain a connection with Prvić, Zlarin and other islands, and in the Lošinj archipelago, if necessary, use them on other lines as well. The approximate length of the ships should be about 45 to 50 meters, with a transport capacity of about 390 passengers. The planned value of each of the ships, according to unofficial announcements, is around EUR 15 million, with co-financing by EU funds in the amount of 65 percent of their total value. These ships should be built by the end of 2026 at the latest, and by then HEP, together with the competent port authorities, should provide adequate connections for charging their batteries in the ports where they will dock. This year, Jadrolinija intends to start the construction of a new ferry for the Zadar water area.

Ships 
List of ships update on: 27 February 2023

Ferries

Catamarans

Conventional ships

Former ships 
MF Lubenice - built in 1989, sold for scrap to Turkey in 2022

MF Prizna - built in 1970, sold to Morsko dobro from Montenegro in 2023

Gallery

References

Further reading

External links

Ferry companies of Croatia
Government-owned transport companies
Companies based in Rijeka
Transport companies established in 1947
1947 establishments in Croatia
Government-owned companies of Croatia
Croatian brands